Coiba Airport  is an airport serving Isla Coiba, a Pacific island in the Veraguas Province of Panama. The island and the surrounding waters are part of the Coiba National Park, a World Heritage Site.

The airport is on the eastern shore of the island. South approach and departure are over the water.

See also

Transport in Panama
List of airports in Panama

References

External links
OpenStreetMap - Coiba Airport
Google Maps - Coiba
FallingRain - Coiba Airport

Airports in Panama